Dasypyga is a genus of snout moths. It was described by Ragonot in 1887.

Species
Dasypyga alternosquamella Ragonot, 1887
Dasypyga belizensis Neunzig and Dow, 1993
Dasypyga independencia Neunzig, 1996
Dasypyga salmocolor Blanchard, 1970

References

Phycitinae